Anshuman is a given name and surname of Indian origin. People with that name included

Surname
 Karan Anshuman (born 1980), Indian film writer, director, and producer

Given name
 Anshuman Bhagawati (born 1978), Indian cricketer
 Anshuman Gaekwad (born 1952), Indian cricketer and coach
 Anshuman Gaur (born 1974), Indian civil servant
 Anshuman Gautam (born 1994), Indian cricketer
 Anshuman Jha (born 1986), Indian film and theatre actor
 Anshuman Joshi (born 1996), Indian actor in Marathi cinema
 Anshuman Mohanty (born 1986), Indian politician, engineer, entrepreneur and former information technician
 Anshuman Nandi (born ), Indian drummer and child actor
 Anshuman Pandey (born 1975), Indian cricketer 
 Anshuman Rath (born 1997), Hong Kong cricketer
 Anshuman Singh (born 1935), Indian judge and state governor
 Anshuman Singh (cricketer) (born 1999), Indian cricketer
 Anshuman Tiwari (born 1974), Indian journalist and editor
 Anshuman Vichare (born 1975), Indian actor, director, producer and television personality

See also